Andreas Graf (born 7 August 1985) is an Austrian professional racing cyclist, who most recently rode for UCI Continental team .

Major results
Source:

Road

2004
 2nd Time trial, National Under-23 Road Championships
2005
 2nd Time trial, National Under-23 Road Championships
2008
 2nd Time trial, National Road Championships
2009
 2nd Time trial, National Road Championships
2011
 1st Stage 1 (TTT) Cycling Tour of Sibiu
 2nd Time trial, National Road Championships
2012
 2nd Time trial, National Road Championships
2013
 2nd Time trial, National Road Championships
2014
 1st Harlem Skyscrapers Classic
2015
 3rd Time trial, National Road Championships

Track

2008
 1st  Madison, National Track Championships (with Andreas Müller)
2009
 National Track Championships
1st  Individual pursuit
1st  Madison (with Andreas Müller)
2010
 National Track Championships
1st  Individual pursuit
1st  Madison (with Andreas Müller)
 1st Three Days of Aigle (with Andreas Müller)
2012
 1st  Points race, 2012–13 UCI Track Cycling World Cup, Cali
2013
 1st  Individual pursuit, National Track Championships
2014
 1st  Madison, UEC European Track Championships (with Andreas Müller)
2015
 National Track Championships
1st  Madison (with Andreas Müller)
1st  Points race
2016
 1st  Madison, National Track Championships (with Andreas Müller)
 2nd  Points race, UCI Track Cycling World Championships
2017
 National Track Championships
1st  Madison (with Andreas Müller)
1st  Omnium
2019
 3rd  Madison, European Games (with Andreas Müller)
2020
 National Track Championships
1st  Points race
2nd Madison (with Stefan Mastaller)

References

External links
 

1985 births
Living people
Austrian male cyclists
People from Baden District, Austria
Austrian track cyclists
Cyclists at the 2019 European Games
European Games medalists in cycling
European Games bronze medalists for Austria
Sportspeople from Lower Austria
Olympic cyclists of Austria
Cyclists at the 2020 Summer Olympics
21st-century Austrian people